The Shrimp is a Canadian dinghy that was designed by Hubert Vandestadt and Fraser McGruer and first built in 1972. The boat was designed to employed as a powered yacht tender, a rowboat or as a sailing dinghy.

Production
The design was built by Vandestadt and McGruer Limited in Owen Sound, Ontario, Canada. The company completed 340 examples of the type, but the boat went out of production when the company closed in 1987.

Design
The Shrimp is a recreational sailboat, built predominantly of fibreglass, with wood trim. It is a catboat, with a gunter rig, aluminum spars and a loose-footed mainsail. The hull design features a raked stem, a plumb transom, a transom-hung rudder controlled by a tiller and a retractable centerboard. It displaces  and has foam-filled buoyancy tanks to make it unsinkable.

The centreboard and rudder both "kick-up", allowing beaching. The Gunter rig results in three short spars which facilities storage, as well as transportation on a trailer or car roof rack.

When used as a powered tender, the boat is fitted with a small outboard motor. To allow it to be towed a bow eye is fitted.

Operational history
In a 1994 review Richard Sherwood wrote, "a tender, rowboat, outboard, and small training dinghy, the Shrimp has an unusual gunter rig that helps in trailering or car-topping because the spars are short."

See also
List of sailing boat types

Similar sailboats
Blue Crab 11
Echo 12
Puffer (dinghy)
Skunk 11

References

Dinghies
1970s sailboat type designs
Sailboat type designs by Hubert Vandestadt
Sailboat types built by Vandestadt and McGruer Limited